Greet Van den Berghe is an intensive care specialist (ICU physician) and since 2002 head of the Department of Intensive Care of the University Hospital of Leuven and head of the Laboratory of Intensive Care Medicine at the Faculty of Medicine, KU Leuven.

Biography 
Born in 1960, Van den Berghe studied medicine at KU Leuven in Belgium and the University of Bristol in the UK and graduated in 1985. After 5 years of training, she received a board certification as Specialist in Anesthesiology and Resuscitation in 1989 and after an additional year of specialization she was board certified as "Intensive Care Specialist". In 1994, she completed a doctoral thesis on "Dopamine and Pituitary Hormones in Critical illness" and received the title of PhD.

Her main research focus has been endocrinology, metabolism and nutritional management of ICU patients.

In 2011 she was elected a Fellow of the Royal College of Physicians of Edinburgh, and in 2013 to be both a member of the European Society of Intensive Care Medicine and the German National Academy of Sciences - Leopoldina. She is also a member of the Belgian Royal Academy of Medicine.

References 

Academic staff of KU Leuven
Living people
Fellows of the Royal College of Physicians of Edinburgh
Members of the German Academy of Sciences Leopoldina
Year of birth missing (living people)